Dwayne Virgil Thomas (born April 22, 1984) is a US Virgin Islands soccer player who currently plays as a defender.

References 

1984 births
Living people
Association football defenders
United States Virgin Islands soccer players
United States Virgin Islands international soccer players
Helenites players